Magnus Sahlberg (born 17 February 1984) is a Swedish badminton player. He won the men's singles title at the National Championships in 2008, and in the men's doubles event in 2012. He also won the international level tournament at the 2006 Iceland International and 2009 Portugal International.

Achievements

BWF International Challenge/Series 
Men's singles

Men's doubles

 BWF International Challenge tournament
 BWF International Series tournament

References

External links
IBF Player Profile

Living people
1984 births
Sportspeople from Gothenburg
Swedish male badminton players